YIH or Yih may refer to:

Western Yiddish language's ISO 639-3 language code
Yichang Sanxia Airport's IATA code

People with the name
 Mae Yih (born 1928), former member of both houses of the legislature of the U.S. state of Oregon
 Chia-Shun Yih (1918–1997), Professor Emeritus at the University of Michigan